Zhongtai is a metro station on Line 16 of the Hangzhou Metro in China. It is located in the Yuhang District of Hangzhou.

References

Railway stations in Zhejiang
Railway stations in China opened in 2020
Hangzhou Metro stations